Shobha Sen (17 September 1923 – 13 August 2017) (also known as Sova Sen) was Bengali theatre and film actress.

Career
After graduating from Bethune College, she joined Gananatya Sangstha and acted in the lead female role of Nabanna.  She joined the Little Theatre Group in 1953-54 which later became People's Theatre Group. Since then she has acted in many productions of the group, chief among them are: Barricade, Tiner Taloyar and Titumir.
She has also worked in some films, including Ek Adhuri Kahani.

On 10 April 2010, Sen received the Mother Teresa International Award.

Personal life
Shobha Sen married two times, and had one child by each marriage. Her first husband, Deba Prasad Sen, was a freedom fighter. They had one son, Udayan Sen, before the marriage ended in divorce. In 1960, she married actor and theatre personality Utpal Dutt, who was six years younger than her. Shobha and Utpal Dutt have one daughter, Dr. Bishnupriya Dutt, who is a professor of theatre history in the School of Arts and Aesthetics at Jawaharlal Nehru University, New Delhi.

Works

Plays
Nabanna (1944)
Barricade
Tiner Taloyar
Titumir
Kallol
Angar

Films
Bhagavan Sri Ramakrishna, 1955 film by Prafulla Chakraborty
Adarsha Hindu Hotel, 1957 film
Khokababur Pratyabartan, 1960 film by Agradoot
Bedeni, unfinished film of Ritwik Ghatak.
Ek Adhuri Kahani, 1972 film directed by Mrinal Sen.
Jharh, 1979 film directed by Utpal Dutt.
Thagini 1974 film directed by Tarun Majumdar
Ek Din Pratidin, 1979 film directed by Mrinal Sen.
Baisakhi Megh, 1981 film directed by Utpal Dutt.
Paka Dekha, 1980 film directed by Arabinda Mukherjee.
Pasand Apni Apni, 1983 Hindi film directed by Basu Chatterjee.
Dekha, 2001 film directed by Gautam Ghose.
Shadows of Time, 2004 German film in Bengali directed by Florian Gallenberger.

References

External links
 (as "Sova Sen")

1923 births
2017 deaths
Indian theatre directors
Bethune College alumni
University of Calcutta alumni
Indian stage actresses
Indian People's Theatre Association people
Indian film actresses
Bengali Hindus
Recipients of the Sangeet Natak Akademi Award
Kalakar Awards winners
Indian women theatre directors
20th-century Indian actresses
People from Faridpur District